Strontium bromate is a rarely considered chemical in the laboratory or in industries. It is, however, mentioned in the book Uncle Tungsten: Memories of a Chemical Boyhood by Oliver Sacks. There it is said that this salt glows when crystallized from a saturated aqueous solution. Chemically this salt is soluble in water, and is a moderately strong oxidizing agent.  

Strontium bromate is toxic if ingested and irritates the skin and respiratory tract if come into contact with or inhaled, respectively. Its chemical formula is Sr(BrO3)2.

References 

Strontium compounds
Bromates
Inorganic compounds
Oxidizing agents